The Guldbagge for Best Costume Design is a Swedish film award presented annually by the Swedish Film Institute (SFI) as part of the Guldbagge Awards (Swedish: "Guldbaggen") to costume designers working in the Swedish motion picture industry.

Winners and nominees 
Each Guldbagge Awards ceremony is listed chronologically below along with the winner of the Guldbagge Award for Best Costume Design and the film associated with the award. In the columns under the winner of each award are the other nominees for best costume design.

2010s

2020s

See also 
 Academy Award for Best Costume Design
 BAFTA Award for Best Costume Design
 Critics' Choice Movie Award for Best Costume Design

Notes and references

External links 
  
  
 

Awards established in 2011
Awards for film costume design
Costume design
Costume Design
Costume Design